Halime Oguz (born 15 June 1970 in Tavsancali, Turkey) is a Turkish-Danish politician, who is a member of the Folketing for the Socialist People's Party. She was elected into parliament at the 2019 Danish general election.

Political career
Oguz was elected into parliament at the 2019 election, where she received 1,278 personal votes.

References

External links 
 Biography on the website of the Danish Parliament (Folketinget)

1970 births
Living people
People from Kulu, Konya
Socialist People's Party (Denmark) politicians
21st-century Danish women politicians
Women members of the Folketing
Members of the Folketing 2019–2022